In mathematics, a quasi-finite field is a generalisation of a finite field. Standard local class field theory usually deals with complete valued fields whose residue field is finite (i.e. non-archimedean local fields), but the theory applies equally well when the residue field is only assumed quasi-finite.

Formal definition 

A quasi-finite field is a perfect field K together with an isomorphism of topological groups
 
where Ks is an algebraic closure of K (necessarily separable because K is perfect). The field extension Ks/K is infinite, and the Galois group is accordingly given the Krull topology. The group  is the profinite completion of integers with respect to its subgroups of finite index.

This definition is equivalent to saying that K has a unique (necessarily cyclic) extension Kn of degree n for each integer n ≥ 1, and that the union of these extensions is equal to Ks. Moreover, as part of the structure of the quasi-finite field, there is a generator Fn for each Gal(Kn/K), and the generators must be coherent, in the sense that if n divides m, the restriction of Fm to Kn is equal to Fn.

Examples 

The most basic example, which motivates the definition, is the finite field K = GF(q). It has a unique cyclic extension of degree n, namely Kn = GF(qn). The union of the Kn is the algebraic closure Ks. We take Fn to be the Frobenius element; that is, Fn(x) = xq.

Another example is K = C((T)), the ring of formal Laurent series in T over the field C of complex numbers. (These are simply formal power series in which we also allow finitely many terms of negative degree.) Then K has a unique cyclic extension
 
of degree n for each n ≥ 1, whose union is an algebraic closure of K called the field of Puiseux series, and that a generator of Gal(Kn/K) is given by
 
This construction works if C is replaced by any algebraically closed field C of characteristic zero.

Notes

References 
 
 

Class field theory
Field (mathematics)